Active Islamic Youth was a small youth organization based in Bosnia and Herzegovina. It was active in the Bosnian postwar period. According to some media reports, it was described as a front for the Saudi High Commission for Relief and the Al-Haramain Islamic Foundation. 

AIO was the first publisher of the Islamic magazine Saff, with an estimated circulation of 9,000.

The AIO was launched after the 1992-1995 Bosnian war, when a group of young Bosnian Muslims decided to form the organization to promote the Islamic teachings they learned from the Arab volunteers who fought on the Bosnian side during the war. The volunteers were also Islamic missionaries. They distributed Islamic literature. Some of the literature tend to designate dozens of habits of the Bosnian Muslims that had nothing to do with the Wahabi teachings and that had to be corrected. These Arab fighters and missionaries influenced some of the young Bosniaks who joined the Bosnian Mujahideen during the war. After the war, these young people went on to form AIO.

AIO's mission is to awaken the religious feelings of Bosnian Muslims - who, the organization believes, have been deprived of the real Islam for too long, first by the Communist regime of the former Yugoslavia, and later by the traditional mainstream Bosnian Muslims. The AIO emphasises that it aspires to original Islamic teachings as preached by Mohammed, and that it does not accept any "novelties" in Islam. Members of the AIO are known for their atypical way of praying, and for their Middle-East-style clothes and long beards. The men do not shake hands with women, and the women wear headscarves in public.

People associated with AIO are reported to have behaved violently, including during demonstrations. Leaders of AIO are said to have made inflammatory statements in which they criticized Bosnian Muslims for accepting too many habits of their Christian neighbours. On 24 December 2002 a young Muslim fanatic, Muamer Topalović, shot three members of a Croat returnee family in Konjic, 80 km south of Sarajevo. Topalovic, who confessed to the killing, said that he wanted to do something against Croats. He was subsequently arrested and sentenced to 35 years in prison. Police said that Topalovic told them during the investigation that he was a member of AIO. That was later proven false. AIO leaders, however, acknowledged the possibility that Topalovic might have attended some of the courses the group organized.

After 11 September 2001, Bosnian police have taken a keener interest in AIO's activities. It became clear that some of the Arab teachers who had impressed AIO's founders were potential threat. AIO premises were raided several times, and its finances were thoroughly audited. It has been established that AIO received donations in the past from large Saudi charities, such as the Al Haramain Foundation. In the fall of 2002, U.S. authorities declared Al Haramain a sponsor of terrorist networks and froze its assets in the United States and Bosnia and Herzegovina.

Today, the number of people associated with AIO is shrinking. The organization is experiencing financial troubles, as many of its former donors have stopped sending money because of the bad reputation that AIO has acquired. It covers its expenses through internet clubs and from selling Islamic magazines and literature, but its future is uncertain.

References 

Islamic political organizations
Islamic publishing companies